Lady Godiva (died between 1066 and 1086), in Old English , was a late Anglo-Saxon noblewoman who is relatively well documented as the wife of Leofric, Earl of Mercia, and a patron of various churches and monasteries. Today, she is mainly remembered for a legend dating back to at least the 13th century, in which she rode naked – covered only in her long hair – through the streets of Coventry to gain a remission of the oppressive taxation that her husband, Leofric, imposed on his tenants. The name "Peeping Tom" for a voyeur originates from later versions of this legend, in which a man named Thomas watched her ride and was struck blind or dead.

Historical figure 
Godiva was the wife of Leofric, Earl of Mercia. They had nine children; one son was Ælfgar. Godiva's name occurs in charters and the Domesday survey, though the spelling varies. The Old English name  or  meant "gift of God"; 'Godiva' was the name's Latinised form. Since the name was a popular one, there are contemporaries of the same name.

A Godiva was recorded in the 12th century history of Ely Abbey, ; this, if the same as the figure in legend, would make Godiva a widow when Leofric married her. Both Leofric and Godiva were generous benefactors to religious houses. In 1043, Leofric founded and endowed a Benedictine monastery at Coventry on the site of a nunnery destroyed by the Danes in 1016. Writing in the 12th century, Roger of Wendover credits Godiva as the persuasive force behind this act. In the 1050s, her name is coupled with that of her husband on a grant of land to the monastery of St. Mary, Worcester and the endowment of the minster at Stow St Mary, Lincolnshire. She and her husband are commemorated as benefactors of other monasteries at Leominster, Chester, Much Wenlock, and Evesham. She gave Coventry a number of works in precious metal by the famous goldsmith Mannig and bequeathed a necklace valued at 100 marks of silver. Another necklace went to Evesham, to be hung around the figure of the Virgin Mary accompanying the life-size gold and silver rood she and her husband had donated, and St Paul's Cathedral in the City of London received a gold-fringed chasuble. Both Godiva and her husband were among the most munificent of the several large Anglo-Saxon donors of the last decades before the Norman Conquest; the early Norman bishops made short work of their gifts, carrying them off to Normandy or melting them down for bullion.

The manor of Woolhope in Herefordshire, along with four others, was given to the cathedral at Hereford before the Norman Conquest by the benefactresses Wulviva and Godiva—usually held to be the Godiva of legend and her sister. The church there has a 20th-century stained glass window representing them.

Her signature,  ("I, The Countess Godiva, have desired this for a long time"), appears on a charter purportedly given by Thorold of Bucknall to the Benedictine monastery of Spalding. However, this charter is considered spurious by many historians. Even so, it is possible that Thorold, who appears in the Domesday Book as sheriff of Lincolnshire, was her brother.

After Leofric's death in 1057, his widow lived on until sometime between the Norman Conquest of 1066 and 1086. She is mentioned in the Domesday survey as one of the few Anglo-Saxons and the only woman to remain a major landholder shortly after the conquest. By the time of this great survey in 1086, Godiva had died and her former lands are listed as held by others. Thus, Godiva apparently died between 1066 and 1086.

The place where Godiva was buried has been a matter of debate. According to the account in the Oxford Dictionary of National Biography, "There is no reason to doubt that she was buried with her husband at Coventry, despite the assertion of the Evesham chronicle that she lay in Holy Trinity, Evesham." Her husband was buried in St Mary's Priory and Cathedral in 1057.

According to William of Malmesbury's , Godiva directed in her will that a "circlet of precious stones which she had threaded on a cord in order that by fingering them one after another she might count her prayers exactly were to be placed on a statue of the Blessed Virgin Mary," the oldest known textual reference to the use of a Rosary-like string of prayer-beads.

William Dugdale (1656) stated that a window with representations of Leofric and Godiva was placed in Trinity Church, Coventry, about the time of Richard II.

Legend 
Despite its considerable age, it is not regarded as plausible by modern historians, nor is it mentioned in the two centuries after Godiva's death, whereas her generous donations to the church receive various mentions.

According to the typical version of the story, Lady Godiva took pity on the people of Coventry, who were suffering grievously under her husband's oppressive taxation. Lady Godiva appealed again and again to her husband, who obstinately refused to lower the taxes. At last, weary of her entreaties, he said he would grant her request if she would strip naked and ride on a horse through the streets of the town. Lady Godiva took him at his word, and after issuing a proclamation that all persons should stay indoors and shut their windows, she rode through the town, clothed only in her long hair. Just one person in the town, a tailor ever afterwards known as 'Peeping Tom', disobeyed her proclamation in what is the most famous instance of voyeurism.

Some historians have discerned elements of pagan fertility rituals in the Godiva story, whereby a young "May Queen" was led to the sacred Cofa's tree, perhaps to celebrate the renewal of spring. The oldest form of the legend has Godiva passing through Coventry market from one end to the other while the people were assembled, attended only by two knights. In a chronicle written in the 1560s, Richard Grafton claimed the version given in  originated from a "lost chronicle" written between 1216 and 1235 by the Prior of the monastery of Coventry.

A modified version of the story was given by printer Richard Grafton, later elected MP for Coventry. According to his Chronicle of England (1569), "Leofricus" had already exempted the people of Coventry from "any maner of Tolle, Except onely of Horses", so that Godiva ("Godina" in text) had agreed to the naked ride just to win relief for this horse tax. And as a condition, she required the officials of Coventry to forbid the populace "upon a great pain" from watching her, and to shut themselves in and shutter all windows on the day of her ride. Grafton was an ardent Protestant and sanitized the earlier story.

The ballad "Leoffricus" in the Percy Folio conforms to Grafton's version, saying that Lady Godiva performed her ride to remove the customs paid on horses, and that the town's officers ordered the townsfolk to "shutt their dore, & clap their windowes downe," and remain indoors on the day of her ride.

Peeping Tom

The story of Peeping Tom, who alone among the townsfolk spied on the Lady Godiva's naked ride, probably did not originate in literature, but came about through popular lore in the locality of Coventry. Reference by 17th century chroniclers has been claimed, but all the published accounts are 18th century or later.

According to an 1826 article submitted by someone well versed in local history identifying himself as 'W. Reader', there was already a well-established tradition that there was a certain tailor who had spied on Lady Godiva, and that at the annual Trinity Great Fair (now called the Godiva Festival) featuring the Godiva processions "a grotesque figure called Peeping Tom" would be set on display, and it was a wooden statue carved from oak. The author has dated this effigy, based on the style of armour he is shown wearing, from the reign of Charles II (d. 1685). The same writer felt the legend had to be subsequent to William Dugdale (d. 1686) since he made no mention of it in his works that discussed Coventry at full length. (The story of the tailor and the use of a wooden effigy may be as old as the 17th century, but the effigy may not have always been called "Tom".)

W. Reader dates the first Godiva procession to 1677, but other sources date the first parade to 1678, and on that year a lad from the household of James Swinnerton enacted the role of Lady Godiva.

The English Dictionary of National Biography (DNB) gives a meticulous account of the literary sources. The historian Paul de Rapin (1732) reported the Coventry lore that Lady Godiva performed her ride while "commanding all Persons to keep within Doors and from their Windows, on pain of Death", but that one man could not refrain from looking and it "cost him his life"; Rapin further reported that the town commemorates this with a "Statue of a Man looking out of a Window."

Next, Thomas Pennant in Journey from Chester to London (1782) recounted: "[T]he curiosity of a certain taylor overcoming his fear, he took a single peep". Pennant noted that the person enacting Godiva in the procession was not fully naked of course, but wore "silk, closely fitted to her limbs", which had a colour resembling the skin's complexion. (In Pennant's time, around 1782, silk was worn, but the annotator of the 1811 edition noted that a cotton garment had since replaced the silk fabric.) According to the DNB, the oldest document that mentions "Peeping Tom" by name is a record in Coventry's official annals, dating to 11 June 1773, documenting that the city issued a new wig and paint for the wooden effigy.

There is also said to be a letter from pre-1700, stating that the peeper was actually Action, Lady Godiva's groom.

Additional legend proclaims that Peeping Tom was later struck blind as heavenly punishment, or that the townspeople took the matter in their own hands and blinded him.

Degree of nudity 
While most iterations of the legend describe Godiva riding completely nude, there is much dispute as to the historical authenticity of this notion.

A more plausible rationale for the legend includes one based on the custom at the time for penitents to make a public procession in their shift, a sleeveless white garment similar to a slip today and one which was certainly considered "underwear" in Godiva's time. If this were the case, Godiva might have actually travelled through town as a penitent in her shift, likely unshod and stripped of her jewellery which was the hallmark of her upper class rank. It would have been highly unusual to see a noblewoman present herself publicly in such an unadorned state, possibly bringing about the legend which would later be romanticised in folk history.

Some suggest that the nudity myth originated in Puritan propaganda, designed to blacken the reputation of the notably pious Lady Godiva. Chroniclers of the 11th and 12th centuries mention Godiva as a respectable religious woman of some beauty and do not allude to nude excursions in public.

Images in art and society 
The Herbert Art Gallery and Museum in Coventry maintains a permanent exhibition on the subject. The oldest painting was commissioned by the County of the City of Coventry in 1586 and produced by Adam van Noort, a refugee Flemish artist. His painting depicts a "voluptuously displayed" Lady Godiva against the background of a "fantastical Italianate Coventry". In addition the Gallery has collected many Victorian interpretations of the subject described by Marina Warner as "an oddly composed Landseer, a swooning Watts and a sumptuous Alfred Woolmer".

John Collier's Lady Godiva was bequeathed by social reformer Thomas Hancock Nunn. When he died in 1937, the Pre-Raphaelite-style painting was offered to the Corporation of Hampstead. He specified in his will that should his bequest be refused by Hampstead (presumably on grounds of propriety) the painting was then to be offered to Coventry. The painting now hangs in the Herbert Art Gallery and Museum.

American sculptor Anne Whitney created a marble sculpture of Lady Godiva, now in the collection of the Dallas Museum of Art, Dallas, Texas.

Coventry 

The Godiva Procession, a commemoration of the legendary ride, was instituted on 31 May 1678 as part of Coventry fair and was celebrated up to the 1960s. The part of Lady Godiva was usually played by a scantily clad actress or dancer, and the occasion often attracted controversy. For instance, in 1854, the Bishop of Worcester protested against "a Birmingham whore being paraded through the streets as Lady Godiva." These annual processions were enlivened by constant rumours, beforehand, that the girl playing the part of Lady Godiva would actually appear nude, like the original. These hopes were eventually realised in a play staged in 1974, at the Belgrade Theatre, Coventry, entitled The Only True Story of Lady Godiva, in which Lady Godiva appeared naked, riding a motor bike. The celebration has been revived as part of the Godiva Festival.

The wooden effigy of Peeping Tom which, from 1812 until World War II looked out on the world from a hotel at the northwest corner of Hertford Street, Coventry, can now be found in Cathedral Lanes Shopping Centre. It represents a man in armour and was probably an image of Saint George. Nearby, in the 1950s rebuilt Broadgate, an animated Peeping Tom watches over Lady Godiva as she makes her hourly ride around the Godiva Clock.

From the mid-1980s a Coventry resident, Pru Porretta, has adopted a Lady Godiva role to promote community events and good works in the city. In 1999 Coventry councillors considered eliminating Godiva from the city's public identity. As of 2005, Porretta retains the status of Coventry's unofficial ambassador. Each September Poretta marks the occasion of Lady Godiva's birthday by leading a local pageant focusing on world peace and unity known as The Godiva Sisters. In August 2007, the Godiva Sisters was performed in front of 900 delegates from 69 countries attending the World Council for Gifted and Talented Children Biennial Conference held at the University of Warwick. In the 2010 New Year Honours Porretta was appointed a Member of the Order of The British Empire for services to the city of Coventry community and tourism services.

In 2010 an arts project, "Godiva Awakes", involving a 10-metre-tall puppet version of Lady Godiva, powered by 50 bicycles, leading a procession from Coventry to London, was proposed by the independent company Imagineer productions (best known locally for reviving the Coventry Mystery Plays and reimagining the Coventry Carnival as the Godiva Festival).

Literature 
"Godiva" (1842), a poem by Alfred, Lord Tennyson.
Guli ("The Heart"), a poem by Galaktion Tabidze, includes a mention of Lady Godiva.
The Seven Lady Godivas: The True Facts Concerning History's Barest Family (1939), a short illustrated novel by Dr. Seuss.

Classical music and opera 
Vítězslav Novák composed a concert overture called Lady Godiva based on the story (Prague, 1907; Op. 41).

Film 

 Lady Godiva Rides Again (1950) British film with Diana Dors and Pauline Stroud.
 Lady Godiva of Coventry (1955) starring Irish actress Maureen O'Hara in the title role.
 Lady Godiva, a 2006 film
 Lady Godiva: Back in the Saddle, a 2007 film

See also 
Asteroid 3018 Godiva
 Godiva device
Nudity and protest
The Seven Lady Godivas
Lady Godiva, 1897 painting by John Collier

Gallery

Notes

References

Further reading

  (A.D. 1057)

Historic texts
 Roger of Wendover, Flores Historiarum
  (Eng. tr.)
 Matthew Paris
  (Eng. tr.)

Secondary sources
 (anonymous), The history of lady Godiva and Peeping Tom of Coventry, with a description, Coventry, J. W. Mills, sixth ed., sans date. books.google (Shows Tom effigy with a bowtie)
 Dugdale, William, Antiquities of Warwickshire (1656), p. 66 Internet Archive
 
 
 Poole, Benjamin, The History of Coventry (Woodcut of Tom effigy)

External links 

 
 Cecilia Parsons, "Countess Godiva", 1999, revised 2004: biography and developing legend
 BBC Newsthe unearthing of a stained glass window identified with Lady Godiva
 James Grout: Lady Godiva, part of the Encyclopædia Romana

 
Year of birth missing
11th-century deaths
Godiva, Lady
Cultural depictions of female royals
Godiva, Lady
Godiva, Lady
2012 Cultural Olympiad
English popular culture